Blüm, also alternatively spelled Bluem, is a German surname.

Notable people with this surname include:

 John Bluem (born 1953), American football player
 Norbert Blüm (1935–2020), German politician
 Rainer Blüm, German criminal

See also
 Blüm machine gun
 Bloom (disambiguation)
 Blum (disambiguation)
 Blume (disambiguation)